The Pequest Fill is a large railroad embankment on the Lackawanna Cut-Off in northwestern New Jersey, touted at its 1911 completion as the largest railroad fill in the world.

Thought to have been the brainchild of Lackawanna Railroad president William Truesdale, the Pequest Fill was one of several remarkable features of the Lackawanna Cut-Off, a project that aimed to reduce the length, grades, and curvature of the railroad's main line over the hilly terrain between Port Morris, New Jersey, and the Delaware Water Gap. During planning, Truesdale rejected 13 prospective routes that skirted the Pequest Valley in favor of a bold, costly, yet operationally superior route across it. In order to maintain a more or less level grade across the valley, a fill of enormous proportions would be required to connect Andover and Green Township.

Planning for the route continued through 1906; the final survey map for the line was completed on September 1, allowing the railroad to proceed with eminent domain and hire contractors. The 28.6-mile (46-km) Cut-Off project was divided among seven contractors. Whether by design or happenstance, the responsibility for building the Pequest Fill was divided roughly in half between David W. Flickwir to the east and Walter H. Gahagan to the west.

Construction on the Cut-Off began August 1, 1908. The foundation for the three-mile (4.8 km) Pequest Fill was constructed of 6.625 million cubic yards of fill material, far more than could be provided by classic cut-and-fill techniques. (These require a relatively even balance between the amount of dirt and rock material that is removed from an area of the right-of-way to provide a cut through a hill and the needs of a nearby fill.) So the railroad bought 760 acres of farmland and dug it out to a depth of about 20 feet (6 m). Construction wrapped up in autumn 1911.

The Pequest Fill crosses four roadways (US Route 206 and three county roads), two railroad rights-of-way (the Sussex Branch and the Lehigh & Hudson River Railway), and one river (the Pequest River). There are no overhead bridges or grade crossings.  The east end of Greendell Siding continued onto the Pequest Fill for a short distance; otherwise, the railroad was two tracks wide on the fill.  The Cut-Off saw rail service between 1911 (when the Lackawanna Cut-Off opened) to 1979 (when Conrail discontinued rail service). In between, the Lackawanna Railroad operated trains over the Pequest Fill for 49 years; the Erie Lackawanna Railroad for 16 years; and Conrail for three years.  After discontinuing service, Conrail sought abandonment of the line and eventually removed the tracks in 1984.  

In 1985, the Cut-Off was sold to a land developer who proposed to use the entire Pequest Fill for the now-defunct Westway Project in New York City.  That never occurred; by 2001, the entire Cut-Off had been acquired by the State of New Jersey.  

In 2011, NJ Transit received approval to re-lay track between Port Morris Junction and Andover; as of 2022, the line is slated to open for rail service in 2026. This Lackawanna Cut-Off Restoration Project also envisions replacing track westward across the Pequest Fill, but no funding has been secured and no completion date projected.

References 

History of rail transportation in the United States
Lackawanna Cut-Off